Andre' Chandler Woodson, Jr. (born April 25, 1984) is a former American football quarterback and coach. He was drafted by the New York Giants in the sixth round of the 2008 NFL Draft. Woodson played collegiately at the University of Kentucky. He formerly was the wide receivers coach at Morehead State University.

Early years
Born on post in Fort Lewis, Washington where his mother, Robin Woodson, was stationed in the Army with his father (Andre W.) Woodson grew up a military brat, moving from post to post with his mother after his parents divorced when he was the age of two.  He was raised by his mother as she continued her Army service, eventually arriving in Radcliff, Kentucky, in 1994. He attended local schools nearby, Radcliff Middle School and North Hardin High School, both in Radcliff, Kentucky (Hardin County Kentucky, located near Fort Knox, Kentucky), where he lettered in basketball and football, which eventually led to his being noticed for his football potential by the University of Kentucky.

College career
In 2003, Woodson was recruited to Kentucky. During his freshman season, Woodson served as a backup to Shane Boyd, and appeared in seven games (including one start). For the 2005 season, Woodson was named as the starting quarterback. The Wildcats ended 2005 with a 3-8 record, with Woodson completing nearly 58 percent of his passes, while throwing for 1,644 yards.

After the 2006 spring practice, it appeared Woodson would lose his position to his backup, Curtis Pulley. Spurred by this, Woodson started spending more time lifting weights, began leading the team in practice, and soon became the choice for starting quarterback. The 2006 season, Woodson's junior season, was a breakout season, with Woodson leading the Wildcats to a 7-5 regular season, and their first bowl win in 22 years, in the Music City Bowl. He led both his team and the SEC in passing yards with 3,515, and became only the second Kentucky quarterback to throw 30 or more touchdowns in a single season.

On September 22, 2007, Woodson broke Trent Dilfer's all-time NCAA record of 271 consecutive pass attempts without an interception against the Arkansas Razorbacks. The streak ended, however, when Woodson threw his first interception in 325 attempts on September 29, 2007 against Florida Atlantic University. Against Florida State in the 2007 Music City Bowl, Woodson broke Danny Wuerffel's SEC record for passing touchdowns in one season. Woodson threw 40 for the season, passing Wuerffel's record by one. He also broke Jared Lorenzen's UK record of 78 career touchdown passes.

College statistics

Professional career

New York Giants
On April 27, 2008, Woodson was drafted in the sixth round (198th pick overall) to the New York Giants starting his professional career. On August 30, the Giants waived Woodson during final cuts. He was re-signed to the team's practice squad a day later, where he remained until his release on October 23. Woodson was later re-signed to the practice squad on October 27, 2008.

Following the 2008 season, Woodson was re-signed to a future contract on January 12, 2009. He was waived on September 5, 2009.

Washington Redskins
On September 6, 2009, Woodson was signed by the Washington Redskins to their practice squad. He was released on November 24, 2009.

Hartford Colonials
Woodson was signed by the Hartford Colonials of the United Football League (UFL) in spring 2010. On September 1, 2010, Woodson was waived by the Colonials.

Coaching career

Kentucky Wildcats 
Woodson rejoined the Kentucky Wildcats as a graduate assistant in the summer of 2011.

Morehead State 
Woodson left Kentucky and joined Morehead State as a wide receivers coach in January 2013. He left the staff on December 2013.

Personal life
His first child, André III, was born on his 29th birthday in 2013.

Woodson currently works as a PR and Community Specialist for Amazon.

References

1984 births
Living people
American football quarterbacks
Kentucky Wildcats football players
New York Giants players
Washington Redskins players
Hartford Colonials players
People from Fort Lewis, Washington
People from Radcliff, Kentucky
Players of American football from Washington, D.C.
Players of American football from Kentucky
Morehead State Eagles football coaches